David Braun  is an American football coach and former player. He is currently the defensive coordinator for Northwestern.

Coaching career
Braun began his coaching career as a graduate assistant at his alma mater in 2008. In 2010 he was made the defensive coordinator and linebackers coach at Culver-Stockton. In 2011 he returned to Winona State where he worked as the co-defensive coordinator and linebackers coach until the end of the 2014 season. In 2015 he became the defensive line coach at UC Davis where he stayed until the end of the 2016 season. In 2017 he was made the defensive line coach and run game coordinator at Northern Iowa. In 2018 he was made the outside linebackers coach and special teams coordinator. He was named the defensive coordinator and safeties coach at North Dakota State University in January 2019. and won two Football Championship Subdivision titles there. In 2023 he was named the defensive coordinator at Northwestern.

References

Living people
North Dakota State Bison football coaches
Northern Iowa Panthers football coaches
Year of birth missing (living people)